Theodor Szántó, also seen as Tivadar Szántó (3 June 18777 January 1934) was a Hungarian Jewish pianist and composer.

Life and career
Szántó was born in Vienna, then the capital of the Austro-Hungarian Empire. His family name was originally Smulevic, of Jewish and Slavic origin. His musical studies were in Vienna and Budapest, and with Ferruccio Busoni in Berlin 1898-1901. He resided in Paris from 1905, Switzerland from 1914, and Budapest from 1921 until his death there in 1934.

Szántó contributed substantially to the rewriting of the piano part of the third and final version of Frederick Delius’s Piano Concerto in C minor, and he introduced this version at a Prom Concert in London on 22 October 1907 under Henry Wood.  For these services, Delius dedicated the Concerto  to Szántó.  He also played the work at the Proms in 1912, 1913 and 1921. This final version has become the standard version, but Delius's original conception has also been recorded.

Theodor Szántó was an early champion of the music of Zoltán Kodály and Béla Bartók. It was his playing of Bartók's Romanian Dance in 1914 that introduced Arthur Hartmann to the music of that composer.  For his part, however, Bartók had little respect for Szántó.

He exhibited an interest in the music of Japan by writing at least three works using Japanese influences (an opera, an orchestral suite, and a piano suite).

He also made some piano transcriptions of works by Johann Sebastian Bach and Igor Stravinsky, which reveal a virtuoso technique. His complete piano works  are recorded by the composer and virtuoso pianist Artur Cimirro for the CD label Acte Préalable

Szanto was considered an important piano teacher. His students included Berta Alves de Sousa in Paris.

Szántó was awarded the Legion of Honour.

Compositions

Original works
Szántó's own original compositions include:
 Violin Sonata, 1906
 Land and Sea Symphony, 1909
 Contrasts, piano suite, 1912
 Variations on a Hungarian Folksong, piano, 1915
 Symphonic Rhapsody, 1917
 In Japan: Essays and Studies in Japanese Harmony based on Native Songs, piano, 1918-22 (This work has been recorded by Noriko Ogawa)
 Taifun: A Japanese Tragedy in Three Acts an opera on a Japanese subject, set to a libretto by Menyhert Lengyel based on his play Typhoon; the opera was premiered in Mannheim on 29 November 1924, and had later productions in Antwerp, Budapest and Vienna
 Japan Suite, orchestra, 1926
 Magyarorszag: Concert Sonata in Hungarian style, violin and piano; dedicated to Eugène Ysaÿe

Transcriptions
 Johann Sebastian Bach: About a dozen transcriptions, including:
 Fantasia and Fugue in G minor, BWV 542, 1904 (This has been recorded by Cyprien Katsaris and Marc-André Hamelin)
 Prelude and Fugue in A minor, BWV 543,1912
 Prelude and Fugue in C minor, BWV 546, 1914
 Passacaglia in C minor, BWV 582, 1932
4 Organ Chorale Preludes, c. 1900
 Aus der Tiefe rufe ich
 Ach bleib bei uns, Herr Jesu Christ, BWV 649
 Jesu Leiden, Pein und Tod on Paul Stockmann's "Jesu Leiden, Pein und Tod"
 Allein Gott in der Hoh sei Ehr, BWV 663
 Igor Stravinsky: 
 Suite of five pieces from Petrushka, 1922
 "Fète populaire de la semaine grasse"
 "Chez Petrouchka"
 "Chez le maure"
 "Danse de la ballerina"
 "Danse russe"
 "Marche chinoise" from Le Rossignol

Discography 

2017 : Acte Préalable AP0386 – Tivadar Szántó - Complete Piano Works 1 (Artur Cimirro) 
2017 : Acte Préalable AP0387 – Tivadar Szántó - Complete Piano Works 2 (Artur Cimirro)

References

1877 births
1934 deaths
Hungarian classical pianists
Male classical pianists
Hungarian Jews
Musicians from Vienna
Jewish classical composers
Jewish classical pianists
Recipients of the Legion of Honour
Hungarian male classical composers
Hungarian classical composers